Megher Koley Rod (English: Sunshines in the Lap of Clouds) is a 2008 Bangladeshi film directed by Nargis Akhtar and stars Riaz and Popy in lead roles. It earned six awards at 33rd Bangladesh National Film Awards.

Synopsis 
It is deals with HIV AIDS disease. Its story is parallel to the director's first movie Meghla Akash. The film is made to create consciousness about lethal HIV AIDS, confirmed by the director. Popy plays an AIDS patient, Rodela.

Cast 
 Riaz - Udoy
 Popy - Rodela
 Tony Dias - Nijhum
 Amirul Haque Chowdhury
 Rasheda Chowdhury
 Dilara Zaman

Soundtrack

Awards 
33rd Bangladesh National Film Awards
 Best Actress - Popy
 Best Story - Mohammad Rafiquzzaman
 Best Lyrics - Kabir Bakul
 Best Art Direction - Kalantar
 Best Costume Design - Md Shamsul Islam

See also 
 Meghla Akash
 Abujh Bou

References

External links 
 

2008 films
Bengali-language Bangladeshi films
Films directed by Nargis Akhter
2000s Bengali-language films
HIV/AIDS in film